Halleorchis is a genus of orchids (family Orchidaceae) belonging to the subfamily Orchidoideae.

References

Goodyerinae
Cranichideae genera